Luca Felicetti (born 17 August 1981) is an Italian former professional ice hockey player.

Felicetti played for HC Fassa, SG Pontebba, HC Valpellice, SG Cortina, Ritten Sport and the WSV Sterzing Broncos. Felicetti competed in the 2012 IIHF World Championship as a member of the Italy men's national ice hockey team.

References

External links

1981 births
Living people
Fairbanks Ice Dogs players
SHC Fassa players
Italian ice hockey forwards
People from Cavalese
SG Pontebba players
Ritten Sport players
HC Valpellice players
Wipptal Broncos players
Sportspeople from Trentino